Un roi sans divertissement (lit. "a king without distraction"), published in English as A King Alone, is a 1947 novel by the French writer Jean Giono. The narrative is set between 1843 and 1848 in the French Prealps and follows a police officer who discovers unpleasant truths about himself during a murder investigation. It was the first book by Giono to be published after World War II and marks the beginning of a new phase in the author's oeuvre.

The book was the basis for the 1963 film A King Without Distraction, directed by François Leterrier from a screenplay by Giono.

Origin
Jean Giono was a pacifist and had participated in the journal La Gerbe which was seen with suspicion after World War II. He was imprisoned in 1944 by commissars from the French Resistance and blacklisted by the Conseil national des écrivains. Un roi sans divertissement was written in the autumn of 1946. The lyrical prose and humanism of Giono's works from the interwar period was replaced by pessimism and sarcastic humour, something which came to characterise many of the author's post-war novels.

Publication
The book was published by éditions de la Table ronde in June 1947, breaking the embargo from the Conseil national des écrivains and making Un roi sans divertissement the first book by Giono to be published after the war. It was republished by éditions Gallimard in December the same year. The book has been grouped with several other of the author's post-war novels. In 1962 Giono gave these works the label "chroniques romanesques" ("romantic chronicles").

The book was translated into English by Alyson Waters in 2019.

References
Notes

Literature
 

1947 French novels
French novels adapted into films
French-language novels
Novels set in 19th-century France
Novels set in the 1840s
Novels by Jean Giono